Schickele is a surname. Notable people with the surname include:

David Schickele (1937–1999), American musician, actor, and director
Peter Schickele (born 1935), American composer, musical educator, and parodist
René Schickele (1883–1940), German-French writer, essayist, and translator